The Fighting Guardsman is a 1946 American adventure film directed by Henry Levin.

It was a swashbuckler starring Willard Parker based on a novel by Alexander Dumas.

Plot
A French baron (Willard Parker) leads rebels like a Robin Hood, stealing Louis XVI's taxes to give to the poor.

Cast
 Willard Parker as Roland, also known as the Baron de Saint-Hermaine
 Anita Louise as Amelie de Montrevel
 Janis Carter as Christine Roualt
 John Loder as Sir John Tanlay
 Edgar Buchanan as Pepe
 George Macready as Gaston de Montrevel
 Lloyd Corrigan as King Louis XVI

Production
It was Parker's first lead role; he made it on his return from the army. Filming started in December 1944.

References

External links
 
 The Fighting Guardsman at TCMDB

1946 films
American swashbuckler films
Films directed by Henry Levin
Films set in France
Films set in the 18th century
1940s historical adventure films
American historical adventure films
Columbia Pictures films
American black-and-white films
Films scored by Paul Sawtell
Films based on works by Alexandre Dumas
1940s English-language films
1940s American films